Richard John Hely-Hutchinson, 4th Earl of Donoughmore PC FRS (4 April 1823 – 22 February 1866), styled Viscount Suirdale between 1832 and 1851, was a British Conservative politician.

Background
Donoughmore was the son of John Hely-Hutchinson, 3rd Earl of Donoughmore, and the Hon. Margaret, daughter of Luke Gardiner, 1st Viscount Mountjoy.

Political career

Donoughmore was appointed High Sheriff of Tipperary for 1847.

He entered the House of Lords on the death of his father in 1851. He held office as Vice-President of the Board of Trade and Paymaster General in Lord Derby's second government, and was promoted to the actual presidency of the Board of Trade in February 1859 on the resignation of J. W. Henley over the abortive 1859 Reform Bill. He remained in this post until the government fell in June of the same year. In 1858 he was admitted to the Privy Council.

In 1865 he was elected a Fellow of the Royal Society.

Family
Lord Donoughmore married Thomasina Jocelyn, daughter of Walter Steele, in 1847. Their fifth son the Hon. Sir Walter Hely-Hutchinson was a diplomat. Donoughmore died in February 1866, aged 42, and was succeeded in the earldom by his eldest son, John. The Countess of Donoughmore died in May 1890.

Colonel Lewis Vivian Loyd was married on 14 August 1879 to Lady Mary Sophia Hely Hutchinson (1854–1936), daughter of the 4th Earl of Donoughmore,  a writer and translator with whom he had three children: two sons and a daughter.

Freemasonry
He was Intitated in Lodge No.12, in Ireland and was Senior Grand Warden of the Grand Lodge of Ireland for 1846.. He was made an Honorary Member of Lodge Holyrood House (St Luke's), No.44, on 7 January 1846.

References

External links

|-

1823 births
1866 deaths
Members of the Privy Council of the United Kingdom
Conservative Party (UK) hereditary peers
Fellows of the Royal Society
United Kingdom Paymasters General
Richard
High Sheriffs of Tipperary
Presidents of the Board of Trade
Earls of Donoughmore